The Kabanga Nickel Project is an active mine exploration project 130 km south west of Lake Victoria in the Ngara District of the Kagera Region in Tanzania.    The project is a joint venture between Barrick Gold and Xstrata Nickel.

As of 16 July 2007 The exploration program has so far placed 9.7 million tonnes at 2.37% nickel into the indicated resource category, with an additional 30.3 million tonnes at 2.8% nickel in the estimated inferred resource category.  Construction of the permanent mining camp is expected to begin in 2009 with operations commencing in 2011.  At full capacity the mine is estimated to employ over 2,000 people.  At present Xstrata has invested US$95 million in the pre-feasibility stage of development.

References

External links
 Kabanga (TZA-00038) Secretariat of the African, Caribbean and Pacific Group of States website

Mining in Tanzania
Barrick Gold
Xstrata